Walden is a town in Caledonia County, Vermont, United States. The population was 956 at the 2020 census. The community has no ZIP code of its own; mail is routed through the West Danville and East Hardwick post offices.

Geography
Vermont Route 15 passes through the town, leading west to Hardwick and Morrisville and east to Danville.

Demographics

As of the census of 2000, there were 782 people, 301 households, and 219 families residing in the town.  The population density was 20.2 people per square mile (7.8/km2).  There were 499 housing units at an average density of 12.9 per square mile (5.0/km2).  The racial makeup of the town was 98.21% White, 0.51% African American, 0.13% Native American, 0.13% from other races, and 1.02% from two or more races. Hispanic or Latino of any race were 0.26% of the population.

There were 301 households, out of which 39.5% had children under the age of 18 living with them, 58.5% were married couples living together, 12.0% had a female householder with no husband present, and 27.2% were non-families. 22.9% of all households were made up of individuals, and 7.6% had someone living alone who was 65 years of age or older.  The average household size was 2.60 and the average family size was 3.04.

In the town, the population was spread out, with 28.5% under the age of 18, 6.1% from 18 to 24, 30.1% from 25 to 44, 25.4% from 45 to 64, and 9.8% who were 65 years of age or older.  The median age was 36 years. For every 100 females, there were 100.0 males.  For every 100 females age 18 and over, there were 99.6 males.

The median income for a household in the town was $37,500, and the median income for a family was $40,625. Males had a median income of $29,625 versus $21,875 for females. The per capita income for the town was $17,253.  About 5.4% of families and 7.8% of the population were below the poverty line, including 10.1% of those under age 18 and 6.0% of those age 65 or over.

Notable people

 Judith Jones (1924–2017), author, editor The Diary of Anne Frank
 Frank Livingston Underwood (1844–1918), banker, copper magnate, railroad founder

References

External links
 Walden School

 
Towns in Vermont
Towns in Caledonia County, Vermont